The Lock Museum is a private museum in Seoul, South Korea.  It is directed by Mr. Hongkyu Choi.

About
Traditionally, Koreans believed that objects fashioned in the shape of talismanic animals invoked the power of these animals, both to ensure the protection of their property and to bestow the blessings of wealth, health, fecundity, and happiness. The exhibition tells the story of this traditional belief in the power of talismanic animals through the intensely rich visual vocabulary of the symbolic motifs employed in Korean folk art.

As with locks and latches, key charms also evolved from functional key holders into largely symbolic objects that became exquisitely decorated personal accessories. They were passed from mothers to daughters as tokens of the responsibility women bear for ensuring the good management of household affairs. It was customary for families to celebrate special occasions by adorning their walls with the auspicious animal motifs that often were incorporated into the design of key charms.

Collection

Locks
The desire to ensure the security of one's property is universal. Apart from hiding one's property or constantly standing guard over it, the most practical option is to employ some kind of security device such as a lock. In Korea, locks were designed not only with their function as a security device in mind but also with distinctive aesthetic characteristics so that they also could be used for interior decorations. Through the incorporation of symbolic patterns and shapes, locks became an important gauge of the culture and trends of the times. Often, the designs used for locks employed animal and plant motifs to express the user's hopes and wishes for the future.

A lock is a mechanism that secures buildings, rooms, cabinets, or other storage facilities. Locksmithing in traditional Korea had the elements of both science and art. Korean locks have the characteristics of a "secret lock" since they entail a complex structure that must be understood before the lock can be opened. That is, a key in itself is not sufficient to open the lock. An understanding of the overall structure and inner mechanism of the lock also is required. Typically, a Korean lock is cylindrical in shape, while its key is L-shaped. As a secret lock, it is difficult to open because its keyhole is concealed by the overall design and there is a specific set of movements that must be followed after inserting the key to match its inner mechanism. Generally speaking, after the keyhole has been located, it takes from two to seven steps executed in a specific sequence to open a secret lock. Traditionally, Korean locks were individually tailored by artisans and fit with unique mechanisms.

Key charms
In parallel with locks and latches, key charms evolved from functional key holders into exquisitely decorated personal accessories. They were passed from mothers to daughters as a symbolic reminder of the responsibility women bear for ensuring the good management of household affairs. It was customary for families to celebrate special occasions by adorning their walls with auspicious animal motifs incorporated into the design of key charms. Embroidered key charms were widely available in Chosŏn Korea, regardless of age or social class, as they did not require the use of relatively costly metals which made them affordable for everyone. Mothers often presented them to their daughters as a wedding gift. In this context, embroidered key charms were doubly meaningful since they were not only intended to serve as a decoration, but also as a talisman to expel bad spirits. Flowers, butterflies, and birds—traditional symbols of the harmony and loving union of a married couple—were embroidered on silk fabric dyed with natural materials. Some of the most frequently employed motifs in embroidered key charms were peonies and peaches. The former is a symbol for wealth and happiness, while the latter is a symbol for eternal love and longevity.

Key charms consisting of a medallion with attached strands of commemorative coins were a highly valued wedding present among people of high social status in late Chosŏn Korea. The key charms received as wedding presents were commonly used as decorations for the walls or furniture of the living quarters of newlywed couples. The central feature of the key charms was a large medallion embossed with either a Chinese character or a real or legendary auspicious animal. The commemorative coins attached to the medallion were braided with silk—in the five directional colors—into strands that usually were accented by the addition of decorative tassels or knots. While similar to the actual coins in circulation in Chosŏn Korea, commemorative coins were carefully crafted to convey aspirations for the well-being and prosperity of the new family. The artful combination of highly decorative motifs, conveyed primarily by the medallion, but reinforced by the attached commemorative coins, was calculated to catch the eye of an onlooker and effectively convey the aspirations embodied in the use of key charms as a wedding present.

Latches
Gates were used to separate one space from another in traditional Korean architecture. This function made them symbols of the process of opening and closing spaces. As an object attached to a gate, the latch became imbued with this symbolism while also serving a practical function as a lock. The latch is a wooden bar that functions as a locking device on the inside of a hinged gate of a traditional-style building. It was often decorated with auspicious animals. A turtle-shaped hinge panel was traditional and very common, as the turtle is a symbol of long life and security. The basis for this association with security is the hard shell of a turtle, which it was believed would become a strong guard shielding a family from harm. Additionally, as turtles do not lose their grip on prey they have caught, a turtle-shaped latch implies that the door has been firmly shut.

See also
Talismans of Protection from Chosŏn Korea: Antique Locks, Latches and Key Charms(Special Exhibition at N.Y. until Jan. 2010) 
List of museums in South Korea

External links
Lock Museum official site
Lock Museum: Official Seoul Tourism(English)

Museums in Seoul
Folk museums in South Korea
Locksmithing museums